The MBT-70 (German: KPz 70 or KpfPz 70) was an American–West German joint project to develop a new main battle tank during the 1960s.

The MBT-70 was developed by the United States and West Germany in the context of the Cold War, intended to counter the new generation of tanks developed by the Soviet Union for the Warsaw Pact. The new tank was to be equipped with a number of advanced features such as newly developed "kneeling" hydropneumatic suspension and housing the entire crew in the large turret, and was armed with a 152mm XM150 gun/launcher, which could use both conventional ammunition and the Shillelagh missile for long range combat.

The program faced significant challenges from the start, including poor communication and coordination between the American and West German teams working on the project. The U.S. Army and the German Bundeswehr had different requirements which were not aligned and were not resolved before the project was too far advanced to be changed.

By the late 1960s, the development of the MBT-70 was well over budget. West Germany withdrew from the project due to costs and new difference in requirements. The United States continued development of the MBT-70 (spun off as the XM803) until 1971 when the program was finally cancelled, with funds and technology from the MBT-70 project redirected to the development of the M1 Abrams. West Germany independently developed the Leopard 2 as its new main battle tank.

History
The progenitor of the joint German–US main battle tank program was US  Secretary of Defense Robert McNamara. After serving in the US Army Air Forces during World War II, McNamara became a "Whiz Kid" at Ford Motor Company, where he later rose to become president. McNamara's interest in German engineering had been shown during his tenure as head of Ford. He had shepherded development of the abortive Ford Cardinal – a cancelled project involving the redevelopment for US and other international markets of a compact family car designed by engineers in both the US and Germany. This, it was hoped, would result in a new, competitive product for international markets, with reduced development costs.

As Defense Secretary, McNamara began to apply his methods of industrial management to military production. At the time, NATO member states fielded many different weapons systems and these generally lacked common ammunition, fuel and parts; few weapons were developed jointly, including tanks. While West Germany used American M48 Pattons, it had a history of excellence in engineering armored fighting vehicles, and was known to be proceeding with plans to design, develop and build its own tanks. McNamara regarded Germany as an increasingly important member of NATO, and believed that joint development would yield superior weapons that could also be used by other NATO members, as well as allies outside NATO.

The US Armor Branch had long been pressing the Pentagon to fast-track new main battle tank designs. Consequently, McNamara's seven-year timeline was opposed by senior armor officers, who believed an all-new MBT was urgently needed. Others questioned McNamara's high regard for German engineering, arguing that Germany's collective abilities in tank design and engineering had dwindled and not kept pace with innovations since the end of World War II. Within US armored circles, it was believed that there would be a net technology transfer towards Germany and there was a common belief that the UK would make a better partner. However, McNamara's choice of Germany was also due to the country's excellent economic position, following its successful post-war rebuilding: the so-called "economic miracle". Hence Germany was better positioned to financially commit to a project of this scale, in addition to its history of vehicle and weapons technology, design and development.

In order to develop a tank that would meet the standards of both armies, in August 1963, Germany and the United States signed a memorandum of understanding that specified certain desired characteristics and organized a Joint Engineering Agency and a Joint Design Team with equal representation from both countries. Despite these measures, conflicts between the differing engineering practices of each country would plague the MBT-70 project throughout its development.

In 1963, General Welborn G. Dolvin, a former tank commander, was chosen  to lead the US team as project manager. Three contractors—Chrysler Defense, General Motors and a joint venture of Ford and FMC—entered contention to become the contractor on the American side. Dolvin chose GM, anticipating the company would bring more fresh ideas to the table than longtime incumbent tank producer Chrysler. For the Germans, the German Development Corporation was formed as a joint venture of several German firms.

For the first phase of development, GM engineers would work alongside German engineers in Augsburg. For this part, Americans would manage Germans. For the second phase, the arrangement would be reversed: Germans would take over management at GM's factories in Detroit.

There were disputes over almost every part of the design: the gun, the engine, and the use of both metric and SAE units in the separately manufactured components of the tank. This last dispute was, by far, the most contentious. The disagreement rose to McNamara and German Defense Minister Kai-Uwe von Hassel, who were also unable to settle on a common measurement. An agreement was made for both sides to use their own preferred measurements on parts they designed. The Americans conceded that metric be used on all fastening points. This was settled by an agreement to use a common metric standard in all interface connections. The resulting complexity contributed to delays in the development schedule, and an inflated project budget. Another national difference was different methods of projection. In production, confusion over which projection method was being used could result in fabrication errors such as holes placed in the wrong side.

German firms involved in the project were resistant to exchanging intellectual property and pushed aggressively for use of their technology. This stemmed from differences in the procurement system of both countries. In the US, the Pentagon paid for research and development in return for complete ownership of that research. In contrast, German firms conducted research at their own expense, and expected to retain the fruits of their labor in perpetuity.

Dolvin stepped down in October 1966 to assume command of an armored division. The program was considered to be at least moderately successful when Major General Edwin H. Burba took over the project.

Nevertheless, many problems with the tank's political future arose. When a design was finalized in 1965, program costs were estimated at $138 million. With a production decision looming in 1968, this rose to $303 million. The following year critics came up with a different estimate of more than half a billion by accounting for other additional costs.

Many Americans both inside and outside the project, including General Creighton Abrams, hoped for an amicable end to German involvement in the program. Burba was succeeded by Brigadier General Bernard R. Luczak in mid-1968. Luczak agreed that the German partnership was not working out. Luczak found support from Deputy Secretary David Packard, who brokered an agreement to end the tank partnership in January 1970.

Concurrent developments
By 1965 the German Leopard 1 and the US M60 were the newest main battle tanks in their respective country's service. They were armed with M68 105mm rifled gun (developed from the British 105mm L7) and designed to counter Soviet T-54/55 tanks, which they successfully did, according to Israeli combat experience. But it became very clear that due to the same experience the next generation of Soviet tanks would have increased firepower and protection, and both designs would be placed at a disadvantage by the new smoothbore gun in the T-62. An upgrade project for the Leopard was planned, but it appeared this model would not be enough of an advance to be worthwhile.

Design

Many features of the MBT-70 were ahead of their time. The vehicle used an advanced hydropneumatic suspension system that allowed for fast cross-country speeds even though it was to weigh .

The MBT-70 was designed with a low silhouette, unlike the M60, one of the tallest tanks ever built. This left no room in the hull for the driver, who had to be moved into the turret. He was located in a cupola which was geared to rotate so that he was always looking in the same direction even if the turret turned. He could also spin the cupola around, so the tank could be driven backwards at full speed.

The MTU unit could be easily swapped out of the tank, along with the drive train, in 15 minutes.

Armament

The MBT-70's main armament was a stabilized XM150 152 mm gun/launcher, a longer-barreled and improved variant of the XM-81 gun/launcher used in the light M551 Sheridan and the M60A2 "Starship".

The XM578 APFSDS round was made of a newly developed tungsten alloy, which was 97.5 percent tungsten. This new alloy had a density of 18.5 g·cm³, which was a big improvement compared to the older tungsten-carbide APDS and APFSDS rounds. Another new feature of the ammunition was that the tank rounds were "caseless"; i.e., they had combustible cases. The MBT-70 was also able to fire the XM410E1 smoke round.

The MBT-70 was equipped with a laser rangefinder and an auto-loader, located in the turret rear, two 'cutting edge' devices for this time. The auto-loader was capable of loading both missiles and normal tank rounds. Italy had also contributed to the XM-150 as the automatic loading system was built by OTO Melara (now Leonardo). The automatic loading system had a vertical rotating magazine equipped with 16 containers, for 5 types of ammunition, which allowed a firing speed of 12 rounds per minute.

The Germans were planning to use the MBT-70 in combination with the Keiler, a tank equipped with a Rheinmetall 120mm smoothbore gun. Therefore, a suggestion was made to base a version of the Keiler on the MBT-70 chassis; this version was nicknamed Eber, but only a wooden mock-up was made.

The secondary armament of the MBT-70 consisted of a remote-controlled 20 mm Rh 202 autocannon for use against aircraft and light armored vehicles. The gun could be retracted into a container behind the driver's rotating cupola for protection as well as to reduce overall height, and was operated remotely by the commander. Furthermore, a 7.62 mm machine gun was mounted co-axially alongside the main gun for close-defense. The US prototypes were fitted with the M73 machine gun, while the German version utilized the MG 3 machine gun.

The ammunition load of the MBT-70 prototype seen in the Deutsches Panzermuseum consists of 42 tank rounds, 6 Shillelagh missiles, 660 20×139 mm cannon rounds and 2,700 7.62×51mm NATO machine gun rounds.

Protection
The frontal area of both the hull and turret was protected by spaced armor and provision was made for the installation of a polyethylene radiation shielding to achieve an attenuation ratio of 20:1 against neutron radiation.

The outer layer was made of High Performance Armour developed in the United States and incorporated in the mid-1960s in the design of the MBT-70.
The frontal arc of the MBT-70 was protected against 105 mm APDS ammunition fired from 800 m distance.
The High Performance Armour contained 9% of nickel and 4% of cobalt and was produced by vacuum arc remelting. It was heat treated to 500 BHN, like the other types of high hardness armour, but it was produced from the start in the form of plates 40 mm thick.

Two watertight armored transverse bulkheads separated the crew in the center from the multi-ply rubber fuel tank in the front compartment and the engine compartment in the rear.

To save weight, aluminum was used for the engine compartment floor and for access doors on the engine deck.
The MBT-70 was protected against electromagnetic pulses and nuclear, biological and chemical weapons as well.

Compared to the M60 tank, the MBT-70 had a lower profile. With the hydropneumatic suspension lowered it was also smaller than the Leopard 1, which gave the MBT-70 a better hull down position.

The MBT-70 was equipped with eight XM176 smoke grenade dischargers, each discharger barrel contained two smoke grenades; one AN-M8 HC and one M34 WP. Actuated from the commander's station, these launchers provided close-in protection and concealment for the vehicle. The KPz-70 was equipped with 16 in four rows of 4.

Mobility
It was considerably faster than the M60 and even faster than the Leopard 1 tank, while easily besting Soviet vehicles such as the T-62 and T-64. It also could accelerate three times faster than the M60. In cross-country performance the high power engine and hydropneumatic suspension allowed it to travel almost three times as fast as the M60 without causing problems for the crew.

Testing

A prototype series started in 1965, with two mild steel hull and six "complete" hulls of both the US and German versions, for a total of 14 hulls. The lower hull and drivetrain were tested in 1966, and full trials began in 1968.

The tank proved to have better mobility than the M60: it was considerably faster, both in all-out speed and, more importantly, with about three times the acceleration. All of this led to a reduction in the time the tank was exposed to fire, in testing it was 1/3 less likely to be seen while maneuvering than the M60, and it could run a  obstacle course in 30% less time.

A year behind schedule, the U.S. and Germany debuted their MBT-70s publicly in October 1967. An American prototype was displayed outside the Association of the United States Army in Washington. The German demonstration in Augsburg ended prematurely: smoke poured out of the tank after the turret's hydraulics malfunctioned. Observers were nonetheless impressed and German officials said the tank was on track to replace all M48 Pattons of the Bundeswehr by 1972.

Problems
An unanticipated problem was that the drivers complained of disorientation when the turret was rotated, contrary to the predictions of the designers who felt the location of the cupola near the center of rotation would eliminate this effect. The German 120mm gun proved excellent, although only firing APFSDS and HEAT, but the XM150 gun/launcher had serious problems. The similar but smaller XM81 gun/launcher mounted on the M551 Sheridan proved to be just as troublesome. There were also several problems with the ammunition. The caseless design made conventional tank rounds too vulnerable to water. Wet rounds expanded so they would not fit into the barrel anymore or left hard residues after being fired.

The auto-loader was capable of handling the Shillelagh missile without problems, but the combustible cases of the tank rounds could be deformed by it. As is often a problem with caseless ammunition, the ammunition also had a tendency to "cook-off", or fire prematurely, due to heat build-up in the barrel from previously fired rounds. The attempted solution, to only carry a single round with the balance in missiles, also proved unacceptable. Deployment of the 20mm anti-aircraft cannon also proved difficult and the weapon itself was overcomplicated and nearly impossible to use effectively.

Another problem of the MBT-70 was the increasing weight. This meant that the MBT-70 would require its own armored recovery vehicles and bridge-launching systems.

In order to power the tank at the required speed, a turbine engine was developed for the original American model. However, turbine engines need very clean air, and the quantities of dust churned up by tank operations proved problematic. After initial efforts to solve the problem using air filters, the turbine engine was replaced with conventional piston engines.

Commentators on the MBT-70 typically assert that though it was innovative in many respects, the project was ruined by the use of too many untried and unproven technologies. Senator James W. Fulbright commented that to drive an MBT-70, a master's degree from a technical institute would be required.

Cancellation
By 1969 the MBT-70 cost five times what was projected, at $1 million a unit. Originally the planned costs of the MBT-70 project were as low as $80 million (or 292.8 million DM), but in 1969 the project had already cost $303 million (nearly 1.1 billion DM). West Germany's part alone of this was about $130 million (475.8 million DM), which in itself was more than the original planned total costs of the project.

A July 1969 House Armed Services subcommittee report on the troubled M551 Sheridan asked that funding for the MBT-70 be withheld pending a comprehensive review of the program. In August 1969, Senator Thomas Eagleton was granted a request that the Government Accounting Office undertake an audit of the program. 

The GAO recommended the tank development program proceed on an austere basis. Acting on this recommendation, Deputy Secretary of Defense David Packard agreed to withhold $25 million earmarked for the production of six prototypes while the DoD completed a review of the project. Packard was ultimately persuaded by Army leaders that the American MBT-70 project was technically sound. The Army agreed that development would be better off without German cooperation. In January 1970, the Department of Defense ended its tank partnership with Germany and committed to forging ahead with its own design.

Germany started the development of the "Keiler" on its own. Later this program would lead to the Leopard 2.

XM803

Work began on converting the existing MBT-70 design into a low-cost "austere" alternative that would use only American-made components, resulting in the nearly-identical XM803 prototype. Congress hoped to drive down the per-tank cost to $500,000–$600,000, saving $200,000 per tank versus the MBT-70. 

The largest cost savings came from a switch to a less expensive steel armor plating. An American-made engine also reduced costs. The design was slightly heavier and slower. General Motors received a $16.5 million contract to develop the tank in July 1971.

Despite these compromises, the XM803 design began to match the MBT-70 in complexity as development progressed. In September 1971, Congress defeated an amendment by Senator Thomas Eagleton that would cut 35.3 million in funding for six XM803 prototypes. In December 1971, Congress canceled the tank in the defense appropriation bill. The bill appropriated $20 million for cancelation costs and $20 million for the development of a new tank program. This became the XM1 design project, which led to the production-model M1 Abrams tank.

Legacy

In a post-mortem report of his four years on the project, American program manager Brig. Gen. Bernard Luczak attributed the high cost of the tank to the difficulties of managing a joint program. Luczak claimed General Motors charged a premium for its defense contract work, which it considered insignificant compared to its burgeoning automotive business.

In the 1989 book King of the Killing Zone author Orr Kelly called the end of the MBT-70 program, "one of the most fortunate occurrences to befall the U.S. Army."

Variants 
XM742 Recovery Vehicle  - A proposed armored recovery vehicle.
XM743 - A proposed armored vehicle-launched bridge layer carrying the 60-ton capacity XM744 double-folding bridge.
XM745 Combat Engineer Vehicle - A proposed military engineering vehicle with four-man crew, 165 mm (alternatively 152 mm) demolition gun and a 25 mm autocannon.

Surviving vehicles

Altogether 14 prototypes and test beds were built, two made of mild steel. Some of them have survived in museums and can still be visited today.

American prototypes
 One prototype is located in the Anniston Army Depot in Anniston, Alabama.
 Another prototype, as well as a prototype of the XM803, is located in the Armor Museum Restoration Yard at Fort Benning, Georgia.
 A mild steel prototype in bad condition could be seen in the Military Museum of Southern New England in Danbury, Connecticut until October 2019. Following the closure of the museum, it was sold for scrap metal. Only the turret remains.

German prototypes
 One prototype is located in the Deutsches Panzermuseum Munster
 Another is located in the Wehrtechnische Studiensammlung Koblenz

See also

 VT tank
 MBT-80
 Leopard 2
 M1 Abrams
 Main Ground Combat System, joint French–German main battle tank to be produced in 2035.

References
Notes

Bibliography

External links

 
 Department of Defense Appropriations for 1972: Hearings Before the Subcommittee

Main battle tanks of the United States
Main battle tanks of the Cold War
Abandoned military projects of the United States
Abandoned military projects of Germany
Trial and research tanks of Germany
Trial and research tanks of the United States
Main battle tanks of Germany
Cold War tanks of Germany
Cold War tanks of the United States
History of the tank
Germany–United States military relations
United States–West Germany relations